In arithmetic geometry, the  Tate–Shafarevich group   of an abelian variety  (or more generally a group scheme) defined over a number field  consists of the elements of the Weil–Châtelet group  that become trivial in all of the completions of  (i.e. the -adic fields obtained from , as well as its real and complex completions). Thus, in terms of Galois cohomology, it can be written as

This group was introduced by Serge Lang and John Tate and Igor Shafarevich.

Elements of the Tate–Shafarevich group
Thus, the group measures the extent to which the Hasse principle fails to hold for rational equations with coefficients in the field . Carl-Erik Lind gave an example  of such a homogeneous space, by showing that the genus 1 curve  has solutions over the reals and over all -adic fields, but has no rational points.

The special case of the Tate–Shafarevich group for the finite group scheme consisting of points of some given finite order  of an abelian variety is closely related to the Selmer group.

Tate-Shafarevich conjecture
The Tate–Shafarevich conjecture states that the Tate–Shafarevich group is finite. Karl Rubin proved this for some elliptic curves of rank at most 1 with complex multiplication. Victor A. Kolyvagin extended this to modular elliptic curves over the rationals of analytic rank at most 1 (The modularity theorem later showed that the modularity assumption always holds).

Cassels–Tate pairing
The kernel of this form is the subgroup of divisible elements, which is trivial if the Tate–Shafarevich conjecture is true. Tate extended the pairing to general abelian varieties, as a variation of Tate duality.

Poonen and Stoll gave some examples where the order is twice a square, such as the Jacobian of a certain genus 2 curve over the rationals whose Tate–Shafarevich group has order 2, and Stein gave some examples where the power of an odd prime dividing the order is odd.

See also 

Birch and Swinnerton-Dyer conjecture

Citations

References 

 
 

  English translation in his collected mathematical papers 

Algebraic geometry
Number theory